From Nashville to You is the eighth studio album by American singer La Toya Jackson. The album, which has also been released as My Country Collection and Little Misunderstood, features country western music.

Background and production
In Spring 1994 it was reported in various newspapers that Jackson was preparing an album of country music. Tommy Martin was recruited as producer of the album by Jackson's ex-husband and manager Jack Gordon. Gordon described Jackson as "the new country-western heart throb." Gordon also described the album as "very up, very country, very Garth Brooks-like."

Recording sessions for the album took place from March 20–27, 1994 at Creative Recording Studios in Nashville. The album was recorded with a live band and a team of three backing vocalists. When asked by TimesDaily why she chose to record a country album, Jackson replied:
 
  
Martin called on his friend, countrypolitan singer Lee Greenwood, to collaborate with Jackson. The result was the duet "What You Don't Say." Greenwood stated that Jackson "is presented with a great challenge here to be accepted into the country music community. I don't think she is going to have any trouble. First of all, on these songs she is very unique(sic). There is not a voice like hers."

Release and reissues
The album was initially released in 1994, by Mar-Gor Records, a label founded by Tommy Martin and Jack Gordon. The record label eventually shut down, and the licensing of From Nashville to You was sold to Sherman Records. The album with the original cover is still available from Martin's website.

Sherman Records subsequently re-released the album under the titles My Country Collection in 1996 and Little Misunderstood in 2003. The latter release includes a bonus medley of "Boots," "Burnin' Love," "Little Misunderstood," and "One Strike You're Out." A 1996 compilation titled Great Ladies of Country & Western bundles the album with Lynn Anderson's Rose Garden.

Reception

TimesDaily reviewed the album in July 1994 and opined that "people will be pleasantly surprised when they get a chance to hear the album." "I've Got To Be Bad", "Trash Like You", and "Dance Away These Blues Tonight" were highlighted as "rockers" that best suited Jackson. The paper concluded, "Given a chance, this album could be a real big winner for Jackson and Martin."

In contrast, Allmusic described the album as "unriveting, bland" and "weak". It went on to say that Jackson's version of "Crazy" could not match Patsy Cline's rendition.

Legacy
La Toya Jackson has since stated that she regrets the album's release. In her 2011 memoir Starting Over she called the project "bizarre and doomed from its inception."

In a 2007 interview, Tommy Martin praised Jackson's three-octave voice and revealed that he had “remixed a couple of those songs and in some places where she was weak, I pulled it up stronger. The duet is now so full and so good.”

Track listing
"Fanfare - Intro" – 0:45
"Burnin' Love" (Dennis Linde) – 3:15
"So In Love with You" (Lionel Richie) – 4:18
"Georgia Dreamin'" (Keith Vincent) – 3:48
"I've Got to Be Bad" (Rodney Lay, Jr.) – 3:32
"Crazy" (Willie Nelson) – 2:54
"Trash Like You" (Vernon Rust) – 3:03
"Another Heart" (David Lee Murphy, Dobie Gray) – 2:59
"Dance Away These Blues Tonight" (Rodney Lay, Jr., Steve Bishir) – 3:10
"Boots" (Bert Reisfeld, Lee Hazlewood) – 3:37
"What You Don't Say" (Duet with Lee Greenwood) – 3:20
"Little Misunderstood" (Angelo Petraglia, Doug Millett, Morgan Rhoads) – 2:49
"One Strike You're Out" (Ray Burghardt, Ren Ashley) – 3:04
"Break a Leg" (David Briggs, Donna Fargo) – 3:49

Re-released in 1996 as My Country Collection.

Little Misunderstood
Released under Sherman Records. Includes a bonus medley.
"Fanfare Intro" / "Burnin' Love" – 4:00
"So in Love with You" – 4:18
"Georgia Dreamin'" – 3:48
"I've Got to Be Bad to Have a Good Time" – 3:32
"Crazy" – 2:54
"Trash Like You" – 3:03
"Another Heart" – 2:59
"Dance Away These Blues Tonight" – 3:10
"Boots (These Boots Are Made for Walking)" – 3:37
"What You Don't Say" (Duet with Lee Greenwood) – 3:20
"Little Misunderstood" – 2:49
"One Strike You're Out" – 3:04
"Break a Leg" – 3:49
"Medley" – 3:55

Personnel
La Toya Jackson - vocals
Chris Lenzinger, John Willis - electric guitar
Biff Watson, Bill Hullett - acoustic guitar
Don Kerce - bass
David Briggs - keyboards, arrangements
Steve Turner - drums
Bergen White, Cindy Richardson Walker, Jana King, Vicki Hampton - backing vocals
Bergen White - vocal arrangements

References

1994 albums
La Toya Jackson albums
Country albums by American artists
Rockabilly albums